Paul Marie-Adolphe Charles Paray (24 May 1886 – 10 October 1979) was a French conductor, organist and composer. He was the resident conductor of the Detroit Symphony Orchestra from 1952 until 1963.

Early life and education
Paul Paray was born in Le Tréport, Normandy, on 10 October 1886. His father, Auguste, a sculptor, organist at St. Jacques church, and leader of an amateur musical society, put young Paray in the society's orchestra as a drummer. Later, Paray went to Rouen to study music with the abbots Bourgeois and Bourdon, and organ with Haelling, which prepared him to enter the Paris Conservatoire.

Career

In 1911, Paray won the Premier Grand Prix de Rome for his cantata Yanitza. Deprived of paper while a prisoner of war during World War I, Paray composed his string quartet in E minor, and the piano suite D'une âme..., both in his head, only writing them down from memory after the war. Once the war was over, Paray was invited to conduct the orchestra of the Casino de Cauterets in the Pyrenees, which included players from the Lamoureux Orchestra. Casino de Cauterets was a springboard for him to conduct orchestras in Paris.

Paray would later serve as music director of the Monte Carlo Orchestra. In 1922, Paray composed music for the Ida Rubinstein ballet Artémis troublée. That year he and the Spanish violinist Manuel Quiroga premiered his Violin Sonata. In 1931, he wrote the Mass for the 500th Anniversary of the Death of Joan of Arc, which was premiered at the cathedral in Rouen to commemorate the quincentenary of Joan of Arc's martyr death. Paray became president of the Concerts Colonne, and in 1935, he wrote his Symphony No. 1 in C major, which premiered there. Paray made his American debut with the New York Philharmonic-Symphony Orchestra in 1939. He composed his Symphony No. 2 in A major in 1941.

In 1952, Paray was appointed music director of the Detroit Symphony Orchestra, going on to conduct them in numerous recordings for the Mercury Records' "Living Presence" series. Paray left Detroit in 1963.

Paray returned to France and maintained a healthy international guest-conducting career. He was in his tenth decade when he made his last conducting appearance in the United States, leading the Orchestra of the Curtis Institute of Music in Philadelphia. A report in Musical America noted:  "Now ninety-two, Paray brings to the podium not only a reputation as one of the great conductors of our time, but strength, energy, and a solid technique that have not diminished through the years."

Awards and recognition
He was a National Patron of Delta Omicron, an international professional music fraternity. The government of France awarded him its highest honor, the Grand-Croix de la Légion d'honneur, in 1975.

Personal life
Paray heeded the call to arms and joined the French Army in World War I. In 1914, he was taken prisoner of war and held in Darmstadt camp. 

Paray married Yolande Falck in Cassis, France, on 25 August 1942. He died in Monte Carlo in 1979, aged 93.

Selected works

Stage
 Yanitza, Scène lyrique d'après une légende albanaise (1911); poem by 
 Artémis troublée, ballet by Ida Rubinstein, costumes by Léon Bakst (1911–1912)

Orchestral
 Symphonie d'archets for string orchestra (1919); orchestration of the string quartet
 Nocturne for chamber orchestra
 Symphony No. 1 in C major (1934)
 Symphony No. 2 in A major (1936)

Concertante
 Fantaisie for piano and orchestra (1909)
 Humoresque for violin and chamber orchestra (1910)

Chamber music
 Piano Trio (1905)
 Sérénade for violin (or flute) and piano (1908)
 Sonata in C minor for violin and piano (1908)
 Humoresque for violin and piano (or chamber orchestra) (1910)
 Nocturne for violin (or cello) and piano (1910)
 String Quartet in E minor (1919)
 Sonata No. 1 in B major for cello and piano (1919)
 Sonata No. 2 in C major for cello and piano

Piano
 Tarantelle
 Scherzetto
 Impromptu
 Vertige
 Incertitude
 Entêtement
 Berceuse
 Valse-caprice (1906)
 Romance (1909)
 Portraits d'enfants (1910)
 Valse sur un thème de Franz Schubert (1911)
 Impressions (1912)
     Nostalgie
     Eclaircie
     Primesaut
 Reflets romantiques (1912)
     Avec esprit et charme
     Ardemment
     En rêvant
     Avec fougue
     Souple
     Léger
     Tender
     Energique
 Sept pièces (1913)
 Presto (1913)
 Prélude, scherzo et allegro
 Thème et variations (1913)
 Prélude in F major (1913)
 Allegro (1913)
 Scherzo (1913)
 D'une âme... (1914)
 Pieces for piano 4-hands (1914)
 Éclaircie (1923)
 Prélude (1930)
 Allegretto
 Prélude en mi bémol mineur
 Prélude en fa mineur
 Sur la mer
 Valse en fa dièse mineur
 Valse en fa mineur
 Vertige
 La vraie furlana

Vocal
 Nuit d'Italie for voice and piano; words by Paul Bourget
 Laurette for voice and piano; words by Alfred de Vigny
 Sépulcre for voice and piano; words by Leon Volade
 Paroles à la lune for voice and piano (1903); words by Anna de Noailles
 Panis Angelicus for voice and cello (1904)
 Dans les bois for voice and piano (1904); words by Gérard de Nerval
 La Promesse for voice and piano or orchestra (1910); words by Gabriel Montoya
 La Plainte for voice and piano or orchestra (1911); words by Lucien Paté
 Le Papillon for voice and piano or orchestra (1911); words by Jean Aicard
 Le Champ de bataille (1912); words by Théophile Gautier
 Trois Mélodies for voice and piano or orchestra (1912); words by Théophile Gautier
     Infidélité
     La Dernière feuille
     Serment
 Villanelle for voice and piano or orchestra (1912); words by Théophile Gautier
 Chanson violette for voice and piano or orchestra (1913); words by Albert Samain
 Le Chevrier for voice and piano or orchestra (1913); words by José-Maria de Heredia
 Il est d'étranges soirs for voice and piano or orchestra (1913) words by Albert Samain
 Viole for voice and piano (1913); words by Albert Samain
 In manus tuas for voice, oboe and organ (1914)
 Quatre poèmes de Jean Lahor for voice and piano or orchestra (1921)
     Après l'orage
     Adieux
     Après le bal
     Dèsir de mort
 Vocalise-étude for medium voice and piano (1924)
 Le Poèt et la muse for voice and piano; words by E. Thévenet
 L'Embarquement pour l'idéal for voice and piano; words by Catulle Mendès
 Mortes les fleurs for voice and piano; words by P. May
 Chanson napolitaine for voice and piano; words by P. May

Choral
 Os Justi, Offertorium for chorus and organ (1903)
 Acis et Galatée, Cantata (1910)
 Jeanne d'Arc, Oratorio (1913); words by Gabriel Montoya
 Salve Regina for chorus a cappella (1929)
 Messe du cinquième centenaire de la mort de Jeanne d'Arc (Mass for the Fifth Centenary of the Death of Joan of Arc) for soloists, chorus and orchestra (1931)
 Nuit tombante for chorus and orchestra
 Pastorale de Noël pour for soloists, chorus and orchestra
 Soleils de septembre for chorus and orchestra

Notes

References

External links
"A Frenchman in Detroit"
Cercle Paul Paray
 A principled man from Le Treport - bio, insight and photos here http://www.normandythenandnow.com/a-principled-man-from-le-treport/

Further reading
 W.L. Landowski, Paul Paray, musician de France et du monde, in series, Nos amis les musiciens, Lyon: Éditions et impr. du Sud-est (1956).
 Bibliography (in French): Jean-Philippe Mousnier: "Paul Paray", Editions L'Harmattan (1998).

1886 births
1979 deaths
French male conductors (music)
French expatriates in Israel
French expatriates in the United States
Prix de Rome for composition
Grand Croix of the Légion d'honneur
People from Seine-Maritime
20th-century French conductors (music)
20th-century French male musicians